Growth hormone-inducible transmembrane protein (GHITM), also known as transmembrane BAX inhibitor motif containing protein 5 (TMBIM5), is a protein that in humans is encoded by the GHITM gene on chromosome 10. It is a member of the BAX inhibitor motif containing (TMBIM) family and localizes to the inner mitochondrial membrane (IMM), as well as the endoplasmic reticulum (ER), where it plays a role in apoptosis through mediating mitochondrial morphology and cytochrome c release. Through its apoptotic function, GHITM may be involved in tumor metastasis and innate antiviral responses.

Structure

This gene encodes a 37 kDa protein which putatively contains six to eight transmembrane domains. As a member of the TMBIM family, GHITM shares a transmembrane BAX inhibitor motif, a semi-hydrophobic transmembrane domain, and similar tertiary structure with the other five members. However, unlike the other members, GHITM possesses a unique acidic (D) instead of a basic (H or R) residue near its second transmembrane domain, as well as an additional transmembrane domain that, after cleavage behind residue 57 (SREY|A), signals for localization to the IMM. Nonetheless, it is possible that cleavage at different sites (XXRR-like motif (LAAR) in the N-terminal and a KKXX-like motif (GNRK) in the C-terminal) or alternative splicing may account for the protein’s observed localization to the ER.

Function 

GHITM is a mitochondrial protein and a member of the TMBIM family and BAX inhibitor-1 (BI1) superfamily. It is ubiquitously expressed but is especially abundant in the brain, heart, liver, kidney, and skeletal muscle and scarce in the intestines and thymus. This protein localizes specifically to the IMM, where it regulates apoptosis through two separate processes: (1) the BAX-independent management of mitochondrial morphology and (2) the release of cytochrome c. In the first process, GHITM maintains cristae organization, and its downregulation results in mitochondrial fragmentation, possibly through inducing fusing of the cristae structures, thus leading to the release of proapoptotic proteins such as cytochrome c, Smac, and Htra2. Meanwhile, in the second process, GHITM is responsible for cross-linking cytochrome c to the IMM, and upregulation of GHITM is associated with delayed cytochrome c release, regardless of outer mitochondrial membrane permeabilization. Thus, GHITM controls the release of cytochrome c from the mitochondria and can potentially interfere with the apoptotic process to promote cell survival. Moreover, GHITM may further plays a role in apoptosis through maintaining calcium ion homeostasis in the ER. However, while overexpression of the other TMBIM proteins exhibit antiapoptotic effects by decreasing calcium ion concentrations, and thus preventing mitochondrial calcium ion overload, depolarization, ATP loss, reactive oxygen species production, cytochrome c release, and ultimately, cell death, overexpression of GHITM produces the opposite effect.

Clinical significance 

GHITM may be involved in tumor metastasis through its interactions with the Bcl-2 family proteins to regulate apoptosis. Its role as an apoptotic regulator may also associate it with innate antiviral responses. Overexpression of GHITM has also been observed to speed up the ageing process in HIV infected patients.

Interactions 

GHITM has been shown to interact with cytochrome c.

References

Further reading